William Withers (July 12, 1864 – February 18, 1933) was an American golfer. He competed in the men's individual event at the 1904 Summer Olympics.

References

1864 births
1933 deaths
Amateur golfers
American male golfers
Olympic golfers of the United States
Golfers at the 1904 Summer Olympics
Sportspeople from Lexington, Kentucky